Charles Robert Jenkins was a United States Army deserter, North Korean prisoner, and voice for Japanese abductees in North Korea.

It was a fear of combat and possible service in the Vietnam War that led then-Sergeant Jenkins to abandon his patrol and walk across the Korean Demilitarized Zone in January 1965.  Instead of being sent to the Soviet Union and then traded back to the US, Jenkins was held captive in North Korea for over 39 years.  While held prisoner, Jenkins was tortured, forced to wed a captured Japanese national, and performed in North Korean propaganda videos.

With improved Japanese–North Korean relations, Jenkins was allowed to travel to Japan and flee the communist Korean state in 2004.  After reporting to Camp Zama that September, Jenkins was court-martialed and served 25 days in the brig at United States Fleet Activities Yokosuka.  Until his death in 2017, Jenkins lived in his wife's childhood Sado home with her and their two daughters, wrote a book about his experiences in North Korea, worked in a local museum, and was treated like a celebrity by the Japanese.

Personal life
He had at least two siblings: a younger sister (Pat) and a younger brother (Stanford). Rich dropped out of Rich Square High School—precipitated by either a sports injury or the mid-1950s death of his father—in the seventh grade. In 2004, Pat and Jenkins' mother (Pattie Casper; born in ) still lived in the state. Casper died in Rich Square at age 94, and was buried by Jenkins.

US Army

Lacking a high school diploma, Jenkins enlisted in the North Carolina National Guard from 1955 through April 1958.  After his honorable discharge from the Guard, he enlisted in the active-duty United States Army that same year as a light weapons infantryman.  First stationed at Fort Hood, Jenkins next volunteered to deploy with the 7th Infantry Division to South Korea from August 1960 through September 1961; while there, he was promoted to sergeant.  After briefly returning to the US, Jenkins was assigned to the 3rd Armored Division in West Germany until 1964.  That year, he volunteered for a second deployment to the Korean Demilitarized Zone (DMZ).

Desertion
On 5 January 1965, 24-year-old Sergeant Jenkins was stationed at the DMZ with the Army's 8th Cavalry Regiment when he decided to desert the United States Armed Forces; he was being ordered to lead "more aggressive, provocative patrols", and there were rumors that his unit would be sent to Vietnam. After drinking ten beers to build his courage, Jenkins went on patrol with his squad. To show his peaceful intentions, he removed the rounds from his M14 rifle, and tied a white t-shirt to the muzzle before walking for several cold hours towards North Korea. He had planned to claim asylum with the Soviet Union and then return to the US for discharge and punishment via a prisoner exchange. He was instead held prisoner in North Korea for  years.

The Army declared Jenkins a defector based on four letters that he left behind in his barracks; one, addressed to his mother, read: "Forgive me, for I know what I must do. Tell my family I love them. Love, Charles."  Jenkins' family disputed this determination because he "always either signed letters 'Robert' or used his nickname 'Super'."  In 1996, Jenkins was reclassified by the US military as a deserter.  Jenkins' nephew, James Hyman, was a decades-long strident defendant of the theory that his uncle had been kidnapped by North Koreans.

Jenkins would later tell Professor Robert Boynton (of New York University's Arthur L. Carter Journalism Institute) "that he had been a double-agent, sent to North Korea by the U.S. to spy on them".  Boynton disbelieved Jenkins' claim, calling it "his attempt to maintain some dignity, and prove he wasn’t just a hapless sap who made a life-altering mistake."

In North Korea
Jenkins was initially housed with fellow US deserters Larry Allen Abshier, James Joseph Dresnok, and Jerry Wayne Parrish. The American men fought amongst themselves, with Jenkins later describing the  Dresnok as a bully who informed on the others to their captors. In 1966, the four men attempted escape by seeking asylum at the Soviet embassy in Pyongyang, but were unsuccessful. In 1972, the four US servicemen in North Korea were given their own homes and declared citizens, though their "constant surveillance, beatings and torture" continued.  

During his imprisonment in North Korea, Jenkins was made to memorize Kim Il-sung's writings and work for the communist state as an English teacher and translator.  Jenkins' lessons in American English lasted until 1985 when it was decided that his pronounced Southern accent was more a hindrance than not.

In 1978, Hitomi Soga (born in ) was a Japanese student nurse in Sado, Niigata when she and her mother were kidnapped by North Korean agents and taken to their country to train more agents there.  At the direction of the North Korean government, the 21-year-old Soga was assigned to Jenkins in 1980, and they were married weeks later on 8 August.  They had two daughters: Mika (born in 1983) and Brinda (born in 1985).  An interviewer of Jenkins would later tell The Japan Times that Jenkins' relationship with Soga was remarkable: Jenkins said "several times that she was the best thing that had ever happened to him […] 'She saved my life,' he told me. I suspect he was right."  After their release from North Korea in the early 2000s, Jenkins offered to dissolve their marriage, as it had been imposed upon them; Soga declined.

During the North Korean famine that killed millions of North Koreans, as an asset for propaganda, Jenkins and his family still received rations of clothing, insect-infested rice, and soap. In their 2004 testimony, Jenkins and Soga told the US Army about their living accommodations in North Korea—or lack thereof. While heat, warm water, and food were scarce, the omnipresent state surrounded them and their home with barbed wire, hidden microphones, and "political supervisors".

Acting

In 1978, production began on the 20-film series Unsung Heroes which tells the North Korean version of the Korean War and its antecedents.  Jenkins was made to play Dr. Kelton, a capitalist warmonger who endeavored to extend the war to benefit the US arms industry.  These films made Jenkins a celebrity; he was recognized on the street as "Dr. Kelton!" and made to sign autographs.  One of these films was delivered to Jenkins' family in 1997—their first sight of Jenkins since his desertion.

His celebrity status as an alleged-defector-turned-movie-star also afforded him greater social cachet as a state prize, allowing him to see Soviet dignitaries and diplomats who piteously slipped him materials and information from outside the Korean state.

Expatriation
Due to the 2002 Japan–North Korea Pyongyang Declaration, Soga was allowed to leave for Japan on 15 October for ten days; she did not return to North Korea.  The government of Japan even petitioned the US to pardon Jenkins, hoping Japanese Prime Minister Junichiro Koizumi could bring back the American and his daughters after a May diplomatic trip.  Ultimately, they refused to leave; because of the U.S.–Japan Status of Forces Agreement, he still faced court-martial if he traveled to Japan—because the statute of limitations for desertion was 40 years (5 January 2005)—and possible capital punishment.  

Instead, Pyongyang eventually permitted Jenkins to fly to Soekarno–Hatta International Airport in Indonesia where they reunited with Soga and the Japanese government promised residency for the whole family. Of the four 1960s deserters to North Korea, he was the only one to ever leave. Upon arrival in Japan from Indonesia, Jenkins spent a month in the hospital at Tokyo Women's Medical University to recover from prostate surgery complications (performed in North Korea before he left).

Court-martial

On 11 September 2004, he presented himself to Lieutenant Colonel Paul Nigara at Camp Zama, saying with a salute, "Sir, I'm Sergeant Jenkins and I'm reporting".  Jenkins' court-martial began and ended on 3 November 2004.  He was the longest-missing deserter to return to the US military.

Represented by Captain James D. Culp, Jenkins' single-day court-martial (United States v. Jenkins) was convened by United States Army, Japan on 3 November 2004.  Colonel Denise Vowell was judge for the bench trial.  In accordance with his pre-trial agreement, Jenkins pled guilty to desertion and aiding the enemy (the latter for teaching English in North Korea).  Vowell sentenced him to "six months' confinement, total forfeiture of all pay and allowances, reduction to the lowest enlisted grade, and a dishonorable discharge."  Major General Elbert N. Perkins, the general court-martial convening authority, changed the confinement to 30 days, and approved the remainder of the sentence, to be in the brig at United States Fleet Activities Yokosuka (where, Captain King H. Dietriech assured reporters, "there will be no special treatment for Private Jenkins.")

Jenkins spent only 25 days in the brig; he was released early for good conduct on 27 November 2004.  Having waived "his post-trial and appellate rights," Jenkins' demotion and dishonorable discharge were executed on 18 July 2005.

BBC News reported that Jenkins may have received only the 30-day sentence because of the intelligence he provided the US.  In 2009, Jenkins told Vice that in addition to receiving a sergeant's salary while in prison—a monthly rate of —he spent his time working with military intelligence.  According to Jenkins, the sentence was "all a big set-up for the outside world so it looked like justice was done. After all, I betrayed my country and people wanted to see me get punished for that – but I was just helping the government with what I knew. They just gave me the shortest sentence possible with a week off for good behaviour so it didn't seem like I was let off the hook."

Civilian life
After his release from prison, Jenkins lived with his family in Soga's Sado childhood home.  In Sado, free from North Korea, that nation was still a part of Jenkins' everyday life.  He continued to fear that agents of Kim Jong-il would retaliate against him in Japan, he couldn't eat sashimi out of fear it would make him sick from the memories, and he was more fluent in Korean than English.  To record what he remembered and experienced, Jenkins published a memoir in 2008: The Reluctant Communist.  In Japan, Jenkins fostered an interest in motorcycling; he was featured on the cover of Mr. Bike, a Japanese motorcycle-enthusiast magazine.

The Japanese Ministry of Justice expedited Jenkins' application for permanent residency, which was awarded on 15 July 2008.  Jenkins worked in Sado selling senbei at a local museum.  Treated like a celebrity, he frequently posed for photographs with Japanese patrons, at times up to 300 per hour.  In Japan, he was credited with helping bring global attention to the North Korean abductions of Japanese citizens.

On 11 December 2017, Jenkins collapsed outside his Sado home, and later died of cardiovascular disease.

See also

References

Further reading

External links
 
 

1940 births
2017 deaths
20th-century actors
American expatriates in Japan
American expatriates in North Korea
American people imprisoned in North Korea
deserters
Korean people of American descent
North Carolina National Guard personnel
North Korean male film actors
people from Rich Square, North Carolina
people from Sado, Niigata
prisoners and detainees of North Korea
prisoners and detainees of the United States military
teachers of English as a second or foreign language
United States Army personnel who were court-martialed
United States Army soldiers